Gallie is a surname. Notable people with the surname include:

Notable persons

Charles Gallie, Scottish trade union leader
Colin Gallie, British auto racer
George Gallie, Scottish rugby player
John Gallie, British target shooter
Menna Gallie, Welsh novelist
Phil Gallie, British politician
W. B. Gallie, Scottish philosopher
William Gallie, Canadian surgeon

Other uses
Eau Gallie, a neighbourhood in Melbourne, Florida, United States
Gli arabi nelle Gallie, an opera
Saunders v Anglia Building Society, an English contract law case, also known as Gallie v Lee